Good service may refer to:
 Permanent Force Good Service Medal
 Singapore Armed Forces Good Service Medal
 Singapore Police Force Good Service Medal